Renato Lima is a Brazilian Paralympic footballer.

Biography
Lima is a Paralympic footballer who won Silver medal for his participation in 2004 Summer Paralympics in Athens, Greece. He also scored three goals at Copa América for 2011 CPISRA World championship in Buenos Aires, Argentina.

References

External links
 

20th-century births
Year of birth missing (living people)
Living people
Paralympic 7-a-side football players of Brazil
Paralympic silver medalists for Brazil
Paralympic medalists in football 7-a-side
7-a-side footballers at the 2004 Summer Paralympics
Medalists at the 2004 Summer Paralympics